This Moment may refer to:

This Moment (album), by Steven Curtis Chapman
This Moment , by Monni
"This Moment" (Marie Picasso song)
"This Moment", by Disturbed from the album Transformers: The Album
"This Moment", by Katy Perry from the album Prism
"This Moment", by Lala Karmela from the album Between Us